Thalaina clara, or Clara's satin moth, is a moth of the family Geometridae. The species was first described by Francis Walker in 1855. It is endemic to south-eastern Australia.

The wingspan is about 50 mm.

The larvae feed on Acacia mearnsii and Acacia dealbata.

External links

Nacophorini
Moths of Australia